A Moment of Romance is a 1990 Hong Kong action romance film directed by Benny Chan, produced by Johnnie To, and starring Andy Lau, Jacklyn Wu and Ng Man-tat. For his performance in the film, Ng was awarded Best Supporting Actor at the 10th Hong Kong Film Awards.

A Moment of Romance tells an action-packed love story between an underworld rag and a rich heiress and is considered a major classic of Hong Kong cinema. Because of the film, Andy Lau was nicknamed "Wah Dee" (華Dee), the character he portrays in the film, while the film is also one of Lau's representative works.

Plot
Wah Dee, a young triad gangster in Hong Kong, is the getaway driver in a jewelry store robbery. When the raid goes wrong, he takes a young woman named Jo-Jo hostage. A senior member of Wah Dee's gang, Trumpet, demands that she be killed, but Wah Dee resists and saves her. After Wah Dee is arrested, Jo-Jo refuses to identify him to the police. While Wah Dee tries to act coldly towards Jo-Jo, she expresses gratitude and affection towards him, who, on the other hand, also starts to fall in love with her. Wah Dee hides in his grandfather's home in Macau to protect Jo-Jo from the triads, but she finds him and they spend time together there.

After returning to Hong Kong, Jo-Jo is forced to move to Canada with her parents, threatening to prosecute Wah Dee for abducting her. Promising to come with them, she insists on meeting Wah Dee for the last time. A letter expressing her no-regret love for him is left in his apartment after she has taken care of a drunk Wah Dee and his flat as well. Trumpet organizes a meeting to announce his dominance over the gang after the death of their leader. A fight broke out, where brother Seven, Wah Dee's boss, is killed by Trumpet and his partners. Wah Dee escapes with the help of his friend Rambo, yet is hit from behind by Trumpet with a metal gas tank.

Nosebleeded and shocked, Wah Dee then decides to come to Jo-Jo's house and picks her up while she is on the verge of leaving. They arrive at a church to organize their own wedding with outfits stolen from a boutique. While Jo-Jo is praying, Wah Dee secretly leaves. He then follows Trumpet as well as two others out of a sauna with a knife, attempting to kill him. With the help of Rambo, Trumpet and one of his mates is killed yet Rambo and Wah Dee also dies on the street. Meanwhile, Jo-Jo is seen running on the highway in the wedding dress looking for Wah Dee.

Cast
 Andy Lau as Wah Dee (華Dee), an impulsive, abrasive, but honorable triad member and biker. He grew up as an orphan when his mother threw herself off a building when he was a child and was raised by his mother's three prostitute friends.
 Jacklyn Wu as Jo-Jo Huen, an innocent, pure-hearted rich heiress.
 Ng Man-tat as Rambo (太保), Wah Dee's loyal friend and fellow triad member who works as a car washer.
 Wong Kwong-leung as Trumpet (喇叭), a rival triad in Wah Dee's gang who is power-hungry to be the head of the gang.
 Chu Tit-wo as Brother Seven (七哥), Wah Dee's boss and Trumpet's main rival.
 Lau Kong as Inspector Kong (江Sir), a CID inspector who is bent on prosecuting Wah Dee.
 Lam Chung as Superintendent John Chan (陳Sir), Inspector Kong's superior officer who is an old classmate of Jo Jo's mother, Shirley.
 Sandra Lang as one of Wah Dee's foster mothers who often hums.
 Anna Ng as one of Wah Dee's foster mothers.
 Bonnie Wong as Lin (阿蓮), one of Wah Dee's foster mothers.
 Yuen Bun as Sing (阿成), Brother Seven's underling.
 Leung San as Shirley, Jo Jo's mother.
 Andi Setyawan as Bob, Inspector.
 Ng Wui as Wah Dee's grandfather who lives in Macau.

Crew
 Presenter: Wallace Chung
 Planning: Ringo Lam, Wong Jing, Ise Cheng
 Action Director: Yuen Bun
 Car Stunts: Bruce Law, Joe Chu
 Art Director: Ringo Chueng
 Costume Designer: Lee Yuk-shing, Yam Kam-jan
 Assistant Director: Chu Yat-hung, Law Sai-kuen, Bosco Lam
 Makeup: Wong Lai-kuen
 Hair Stylist: Chan Tat-ming

Songs

Theme song
 If the World Had Romance (天若有情)  / No Regrets of Youth (青春無悔) 
 Composer: Lo Tayu
 Lyricist: Lee Kin-tat , Lo Tayu 
 Singer: Shirley Yuen
The theme song was later used as the ending theme for the 1991 television series, The Flying Fox of Snowy Mountains, sung by Fong Fei Fei.

Insert theme
 Gray Track (灰色軌跡)  / Dark Space (漆黑的空間) 
 Composer: 黃家駒 Wong Ka Kui
 Lyricist: Gene Lau
 Singer: 黃家駒 Wong Ka Kui
 Never Regretted (未曾後悔)  / Short Term Gentleness (短暫的溫柔) 
 Composer: 黃家駒 Wong Ka Kui
 Lyricist: Wong Ka Keung , Gene Lau 
 Singer: Paul Wong
 Regardless If It's Wrong (是錯也再不分) / No Need to Understand So Much (不需要太懂) 
 Composer: 黃家駒 Wong Ka Kui
 Lyricist: Paul Wong , Mike Lau 
 Singer: Wong Ka Keung

Awards and nominations

Sequels
A second installment, A Moment of Romance II, was released in 1993 featuring a new storyline but similar themes. Benny Chan and Jacklyn Wu return as director and lead actress respectively, while Andy Lau does not return as the lead actor, with Aaron Kwok leading the film instead. A third and final installment, A Moment of Romance III, was released in 1996 with Johnnie To, producer of the first two films, taking the helm as director and Lau returning as lead actor alongside lead actress Wu.

See also
 Andy Lau filmography
 Johnnie To filmography
 Wong Jing filmography
 List of Hong Kong films
 List of biker films

References

External links
 

1990 films
1990 action films
1990s gang films
1990s romance films
Hong Kong action films
Hong Kong gangster films
Hong Kong romance films
Triad films
Motorcycling films
1990s Cantonese-language films
Films directed by Benny Chan
Films set in Hong Kong
Films shot in Hong Kong
Films set in Macau
Films with screenplays by James Yuen
1990 directorial debut films
1990s Hong Kong films